Scandium perrhenate is an inorganic compound, with the chemical formula Sc(ReO4)3. Its thermal stability is lower than that of the corresponding compounds of the yttrium and lanthanum perrhenates.

Preparation and properties 

Scandium perrhenate can be obtained by reacting perrhenic acid with scandium oxide. From the solution, the trihydrate of scandium perrhenate can be precipitated, which loses water at 50 °C to obtain Sc(ReO4)3·H2O, and obtains the anhydrous form at 140 °C. Scandium oxide and rhenium(VII) oxide are formed at 550 °C.

Scandium perrhenate trihydrate is a crystal in the triclinic crystal system, with space group P, a=7.333, b=7.985, c=20.825 Å; α=93.35, β=92.20, γ=97.42°.

Scandium perrhenate can crystallize with ammonium perrhenate in water to form NH4Sc(ReO4)4·4H2O.

References 

Scandium compounds
Perrhenates